Duban is a crater in the northern hemisphere of Saturn's moon Enceladus. Duban was first seen in Voyager 2 images, though the crater has also been seen in much higher resolution Cassini images. In the Cassini image, evidence for significant tectonic deformation can be seen along the northwest rim of the crater. 

Duban is named after a sage who cured King Yunan of leprosy in Arabian Nights.

References

Impact craters on Enceladus